Southard is an unincorporated community in southern Laclede County, in the U.S. state of Missouri. The community is on a county road two miles south of Nebo and 3.5 miles northwest of Lynchburg. The Pine Creek tributary to the Gasconade River flows past the south side of the community.

History
A post office called Southard was established in 1906, and remained in operation until 1939. D. T. Southard, an early postmaster, gave the community his last name.

Notable person
 Julia Southard Lee, a textile researcher, was born at Southard in 1897.

References

Unincorporated communities in Laclede County, Missouri
Unincorporated communities in Missouri